Daniel Ash is the third solo album from former Bauhaus, Tones on Tail, and Love and Rockets guitar player Daniel Ash.  The album marks a departure from Ash's musical style as he experiments with electronica and dance elements in addition to his well-known groove rock guitar style of earlier works.

Track listing 
 Hollywood Fix
 The Money Song
 Mastermind
 Come Alive
 Ghost Writer
 Kid 2000
 Chelsea
 Burning Man
 Spooky
 Sea Glass
 Trouble
 Walk on the Moon
 Rattlesnake
 Lights Out (hidden track)

References

External links 

 

2002 albums
Daniel Ash albums